Bangladesh Forest Research Institute (BFRI) is an institute for forestry research in Bangladesh, located at Sholashahar, Chattogram.

History 
Bangladesh Forest Research Institute was established in 1955 as East Pakistan Forest Research Laboratory, BFRI works under the auspices of the Ministry of Environment, Forest and Climate Change. Aside from its headquarter in Chattogram, BFRI has 21 research stations and sub-stations under five field divisions covering different forest types spread over eight dendrological regions of the country.

Research divisions 
 Forest management branch
 Silvicultural research
 Silviculture genetics
 Seed orchard
 Mangrove silviculture
 Plantation Trial Unit
 Minor forest products
 Forest botany
 Forest economics & statistics
 Forest inventory
 Soil science
 Forest protection
 Forest products branch
 Wood working & timber engineering
 Seasoning & timber physics 
 Veneer & Composite wood products 
 Wood preservation 
 Pulp and paper
 Forest chemistry

See also 
 List of forest research institutes

References

Forestry in Bangladesh
Research institutes established in 1955
Research institutes in Bangladesh
Forest research institutes
Government agencies of Bangladesh
Organisations based in Chittagong
1955 establishments in East Pakistan